The Human Rights Awards are a series of awards for achievements in the field of human rights in Australia, bestowed by the Australian Human Rights Commission at the Human Rights Day Ceremony in December in each year.

History
The Human Rights Awards were established in 1987 by the then Human Rights and Equal Opportunity Commission (HREOC) "to recognise the contributions of individuals across the nation who made it their life's mission to champion human rights, social justice, and equality for all". The award began as an event to recognise human rights in film, television and literature, but  covers a wider spectrum. Of the original categories, only the Human Rights Medal has endured.

In 2020, owing to the COVID-19 pandemic in Australia, instead of the awards ceremony, ten "Human Rights Heroes" were recognised as finalists, including the Torres Strait 8 and Corey Tutt.

Past categories
In 1990 categories included:

Poetry Award
Drama Award
Prose Award
Film Award
Songwriting Award
Television Drama Award
Television Documentary Award
Radio Documentary/ Current Affairs Award
Metropolitan Newspapers Award
Regional Newspapers Award
Magazines Award

The Literature Award, Print and Online Media Award, Radio Award, and Television Awards were discontinued in 2015.

In 2018 the categories included:

 Human Rights Medal (Highest in this awards)
 Young People’s Human Rights Medal (from 2008)
 Law Award
 Business Award
 Government Award (from 2018)
 Racism. It Stops With Me Award (from 2015)
 Tony Fitzgerald Memorial Community Individual Award
 Community Organisation Award
 Media Award
 Government Award (created 2018

Description
, there are three award categories:
 Human Rights Medal
 Young People's Medal (for under-25s)
 Community Human Rights Champion

The Australian Human Rights Commission receives nominations for the Human Rights Awards and Medals categories, with the choice of recipient made by an independent panel. The individual Human Rights Award and Medal is awarded only to an individual who, to be eligible, must have made an outstanding contribution to the promotion and protection of human rights in Australia in at least one of the following areas:

 Taking action to overcome discrimination or infringements of human rights within Australia
 Encouraging greater social harmony within Australia in a range of areas such as race relations, gender equality and the treatment of children and young people
 Enhancing the rights of Indigenous Australians
 Promoting equal opportunity for people with a disability in Australia or countering discrimination on the basis of age or sexuality.
 Increasing awareness of issues of injustice or inequality in Australia.

In addition, the entrants must be a lawful resident of Australia.

The awards are usually bestowed by the AHRC on Human Rights Day (10 December) each year, with a ceremony prior to the COVID-19 pandemic, and announced online since then.

Human Rights Medal
Recipients include:

1987 - Rose Colless OAM
1988 - Reverend Dorothy McMahon
1989 - Reverend Robert Ridley
1990 - Professor Fred Hollows AC
1991 - Justice Michael Kirby AC, CMG
1992 - Eddie Mabo - Reverend Dave Passi - Sam Passi - James Rice - Celuia Mapo Salee - Barbara Hocking
1993 - No Medal
1994 - Dr. Roberta Sykes
1995 - Justice Elizabeth Evatt AC
1996 - Rebecca Peters - Robert Riley
1997 - Dr. Faith Bandler AM
1998 - Vivi Germanos-Koutsounadis
1999 - Helen Bayes
2000 - Rt Hon. Malcolm Fraser AC CH
2001 - Dr. Arnold "Puggy" Hunter
2002 - Michael Raper
2003 - Marion Le
2004 - Dick Estens - Deborah Kilroy
2005 - Kevin Cocks
2006 - Phillip Adams AO - Father Chris Riley AM
2007 - Jeremy Jones 
2008 - Les Malezer
2009 - Stephen Keim SC
2010 - Thérèse Rein
2011 - Ron Merkel QC
2012 - Ian Thorpe 
2013 - Sister Clare Condon
2014 - Dorothy Hoddinott 
2015 - Peter Greste
2016 - Pat Anderson 
2017 - Johnathan Thurston
2018 - Justice Peter McClellan AM - Chrissie Foster
2019 - Rosemary Kayess 
2020 - No Medal
2021 - Larissa Behrendt  
2022 - Mahboba Rawi and Nawid Cina

Young People’s Human Rights Medal
Recipients include:

2008 - Alan Huynh
2009 - Venay Menon
2010 - Jack Manning Bancroft
2011 - Tshibanda Gracia Ngoy
2012 - Krista McMeeken
2013 - Mariah Kennedy
2014 - Daniel Haile-Michael and Maki Issa
2015 - Yen Eriksen
2016 - Arash Bordbar
2017 - Georgie Stone
2018 - Saxon Mullins
2019 - Vanessa Turnbull-Roberts
2020 - No Medal
2021 - Chanel Contos

2022 - Caroline Cecile Fletcher

Tony Fitzgerald Memorial Community Individual Award
Named to honour Tony Fitzgerald . Recipients include:

 2011 Lola Edwards
 2012 Pat Anderson
 2013 Carolyn Frohmader
 2014 Damian Griffis
 2015 Ludo McFerran
 2016 Jane Rosengrave
 2017 Barbara Elizabeth Spriggs
 2018 Catia Malaquias
 2019 Jasmine Cavanagh

Racism. It Stops With Me Award 
Finalists and recipients have been:

 2015 Tasmanian Students Against Racism (Winner), Football Federation Victoria, Multicultural Development Association, All Together Now
 2016 National Ethnic and Multicultural Broadcasters Council (Winner), Welcome to Australia, Beyondblue, All Together Now, Fadzi Whande, Hobsons Bay City Council
 2017 Cohealth Arts Generator Sisters and Brothers Program (Winner), Clinton Pryor, Sean Gordon, ActNow Theatre and Reconciliation SA (joint), Multicultural Communities Council of Illawarra and Why Documentaries (joint)
 2018 Nyadol Nyuon (winner), Mariam Veiszadeh, Welcoming Cities, E-Raced, ActNow Theatre and Reconciliation SA (joint)
 2019 The Final Quarter, documentary film by Shark Island Productions (winner)

Business Award
2018: Konica Minolta Australia, recognised for its leadership on the issue of modern slavery.
2019: STREAT

Law Award
2019: Kate Eastman
2022: Jane McAdam

Government Award
2018:
2019: Armidale Regional Council

Community Organisation Award 
2019: Just Reinvest NSW
2022: Andrea Comastri

Media Award
2019: Jess Hill, for her non-fiction work, See What You Made Me Do, about domestic violence

References

External links

Human rights awards
Awards established in 1987
Australian humanitarian awards